This is a directory of properties and districts included among the National Register of Historic Places listings in Idaho.  There are approximately 1,000 sites in Idaho listed on the National Register.  Each of the state's 44 counties has at least one listing on the National Register.



Numbers of listings by county
The following are approximate tallies of current listings in Idaho on the National Register of Historic Places. These counts are based on entries in the National Register Information Database as of April 24, 2008 and new weekly listings posted since then on the National Register of Historic Places web site. There are frequent additions to the listings and occasional delistings, and the counts here are not official. Also, the counts in this table exclude boundary increase and decrease listings which modify the area covered by an existing property or district and which carry a separate National Register reference number.

See also
List of National Historic Landmarks in Idaho
List of bridges on the National Register of Historic Places in Idaho

Notes

References

External links

Idaho State Historical Society, National Register program
National Park Service, National Register of Historic Places site

 
Idaho
Lists of buildings and structures in Idaho